The 2019 season was the 105th in Sociedade Esportiva Palmeiras existence. This season Palmeiras participated in the Campeonato Paulista, Copa Libertadores, Copa do Brasil and the Série A.

Squad information 
Squad at the end of the season.

Transfers

Transfers in

Transfers out

Transfer summary
Undisclosed fees are not included in the transfer totals.

Expenditure

Total:  R$91,800,000

Income

Total:  R$83,000,000

Net totals

Total:  R$8,800,000

Competitions

Overview

Friendlies

Campeonato Paulista

First stage 
Palmeiras was drawn on the Group B.

Quarterfinal

Semifinal

Copa Libertadores

Group stage 

The draw for the qualifying stages and group stage was held on 17 December 2018 at the CONMEBOL Convention Centre in Luque, Paraguay. Palmeiras was drawn on the group F.

Round of 16 

The draw for the round of 16 was held on 13 May 2019.

Quarterfinal

Série A

Standings

Result by round

Matches 
The schedule was released on February 22, 2019.

Copa do Brasil

Round of 16 

The draw was held on May 2, 2019.

Quarterfinal 
The draw was held on June 10, 2019.

Statistics

Overall statistics

Goalscorers 
In italic players who left the team in mid-season.

References

External links 
 Official site 

2019
Palmeiras